Oleksander Zhyrnyi (born 25 February 1987) is a Russian (until 2014 and since 2018) and Ukrainian (2014–2018) biathlete.

Career
He wasn't very successful in Russian team, so he moved to Ukraine in 2014. He made his World Cup debut at the 2014–15 in Östersund, Sweden, on 6 December 2014. After that he became a regular member of Ukrainian team.

He moved back to Russia in the summer of 2018.

Performances

 Notes
 (RUS) – as a representer of Russia
 (UKR) – as a representer of Ukraine

World Cup

Positions

References

External links
 Biathlon.com.ua
 IBU Datacenter

1987 births
Living people
Sportspeople from Ufa
Russian male biathletes
Ukrainian male biathletes
Russian emigrants to Ukraine
Naturalized citizens of Ukraine